City of Palaces may refer to:

Places
 Agartala, Tripura India (Manikya dynasty) & their residences
 Mysore, Karnataka, India
 Kolkata, West Bengal, India, because of the British Raj buildings in the 19th century
 Udaipur, Rajasthan, India
 Mexico City, capital of Mexico
 Bahawalpur, Punjab, Pakistan

Others
 City of Palaces (ship), convict ship to Western Australia in 1857